Antonio Vallejo-Nájera (1889–1960) was a Spanish psychiatrist. He was interested in eugenics and proposed a link between Marxism and intellectual disability. His ideas led to the thefts of many Spanish newborns and young children from their left-wing parents. As many as 30,000 children were taken from socialist families and placed with fascist families. Vallejo-Nájera was rewarded for his assistance during the Spanish Civil War and he became a leading figure in Spanish psychiatry.

Early life 

Vallejo-Nájera was born in Paredes de Nava in 1889. He studied medicine at the University of Valladolid and joined the army’s sanitary corps in 1910, taking part in the Rif War between 1912 and 1915. During World War I he was posted to the military department at the Spanish Embassy in Berlin. There he met well-known figures of German Psychiatry such as Gruhle, Schwalb and Kraepelin. He also conducted inspections of prisoner of war concentration camps, an activity for which he was awarded medals by Belgium and France after the war. On returning to Spain he worked at the Ciempozuelos Military Psychiatric Clinic. When the Civil War broke out he was a teacher of Psychiatry in the Military Sanitary Academy.

Vallejo Nájera promoted in Spain a personal notion of eugenics, intending to reconcile German doctrines of racial hygiene from authors like Schwalb with the requirements of Catholic moral doctrine, opposed to state-imposed measures of eugenic restriction. He advocated eugamia, a eugenic policy implemented through premarital orientation work based on the biopsychological assessment of a couple’s personality.

Spanish Civil War and Francoist repression
During the Spanish Civil War he supported the nationalists. In 1938, he set up the Gabinete de Investigaciones Psicológicas de la Inspección de Campos de Concentración de Prisioneros de Guerra (Psychological Research Bureau of Inspection of Prisoner of War Concentration Camps), a center for psychological investigations. The bureau was established near the San Pedro de Cardeña concentration camp and had fourteen clinics in the nationalist zone. Vallejo Nájera carried out experiments on female Spanish Republican Army and International Brigades prisoners to establish "the bio-psychic roots of Marxism" and find the "red gene". For Vallejo Nájera, Marxists were genetic retards and Marxism was a mental illness: "A priori, it seems probable that psychopaths of all types would join the Marxist ranks... Since Marxism goes together with social immorality... we presume those fanatics who fought with arms will show schizoid temperaments".

Vallejo’s conclusions were that the only way to prevent the racial dissolution of the Spanish was to take away the red children from their mothers in places "away from democratic environments and where the exaltation of bio-psychic racial qualities is encouraged". By 1943, 12,043 children had been taken from their mothers and handed over to orphanages or Francoist families, but the number of children taken away from their parents may be closer to 30,000. Furthermore, many children evacuated by the Republic to France, England and elsewhere, were forced to return against the will of their parents. In some cases birth records were destroyed and the children's names changed in order to prevent any further contact with their parents.

Vallejo Nájera contributed to the justification of the Francoist post-war repression. He said that the reds should: "suffer the punishment they deserve, with death the easiest of them all. Some will live in permanent exile... Others will lose their freedom, groaning for years in prisons, purging their crimes with forced work in order to earn their daily bread...". According to Paul Preston the "investigations" of Vallejo-Najera provided the Francoist State with "scientific" arguments in order to "justify their views on the subhuman nature of their adversaries". According to the Spanish psychiatrist Carlos Castillo del Pino: "For Vallejo Nájera, reds were degenerates and if they were allowed to breed they would enfeeble the Spanish race. Therefore, they had to be exterminated."

Later life
When the Civil War ended, Vallejo's support for Francoism was rewarded by his appointment as Professor of Psychiatry at the University of Madrid. "He became one of the most influential figures in Spanish Psychiatry and Psychology in the forties and fifties: his name is among the 16 founders of the Spanish Psychological Society."

He died in 1960.

See also

White Terror (Spain)

References

Beevor, Antony. The Battle for Spain; The Spanish Civil War 1936-1939 Penguin books. London. 2006. 
Preston, Paul. The Spanish civil war. Reaction, revolution & revenge. Harper Perennial. 2006. London.  
Tremlett, Giles. Ghosts of Spain. Faber and Faber. London. 2006.

Further reading
Vinyes, Ricard; Armengou, Montse; Belis, Ricardo. Los niños perdidos del franquismo. Random House Mondadori. Barcelona. 2003.

Notes

External links
 The 30000 lost children of the Franco years are set to be saved from oblivion, The independent.
 Documentary. The lost children of the Francoism. (2006).

1889 births
1960 deaths
People from the Province of Palencia
Spanish psychiatrists
Eugenicists
Spanish military personnel of the Spanish Civil War (National faction)
University of Valladolid alumni
Academic staff of the Complutense University of Madrid
Eugenics in Spain